Rodolpho Rath (18 June 1905 – 22 August 1973) was a Brazilian rower. He competed in the men's eight event at the 1936 Summer Olympics.

References

External links
 

1905 births
1973 deaths
Brazilian male rowers
Olympic rowers of Brazil
Rowers at the 1936 Summer Olympics
Sportspeople from Rio Grande do Sul